Road Trip is a Philippine television travel reality show broadcast by GMA Network. It premiered on July 23, 2017 on the network's Sunday Grande line up replacing Follow Your Heart. The show concluded on January 14, 2018 with a total of 27 episodes. It was replaced by Sirkus in its timeslot.

The show is streaming online on YouTube.

Episodes

Ratings
According to AGB Nielsen Philippines' Nationwide Urban Television Audience Measurement People in television homes, the pilot episode of Road Trip earned a 6% rating. While the final episode scored a 4.7% rating.

Accolades

References

External links 
 
 

2017 Philippine television series debuts
2018 Philippine television series endings
Filipino-language television shows
GMA Network original programming
GMA Integrated News and Public Affairs shows
Philippine reality television series